Bells Break Their Towers is the fifth studio album by post-rock band Bright, and their first on the Strange Attractors Audio House imprint.

Track listing
"Manifest Harmony" – 5:29
"An Ear Out" – 11:52
"Flood" – 6:46
"Receiver" – 4:29
"It's What I Need" – 9:28
"Secret Form of Time" – 5:34
"Bells Break Their Towers" – 12:16
"Night" – 9:14

References

2005 albums
Bright (American band) albums